Gornja Bistrica is a village on the left bank of the Mura River in the Municipality of Črenšovci in the Prekmurje region of northeastern Slovenia.

References

External links 
Gornja Bistrica on Geopedia

Populated places in the Municipality of Črenšovci